Tasuma is a 2004 comedy-drama directed, written and produced by Kollo Daniel Sanou which tells the story of a Burkinabé war veteran who had fought for France abroad returning to his home village.

Plot
Sogo (Mamadou Zerbo) is a war-battered veteran who fought for France in World War II and the Indochina Wars. Due to his bravery and ferocity in battle Sogo has earned the nickname Tasuma (the fire) and fears no one, including government officials. He is also civil-minded and kind-hearted, and has promised the women of his village gasoline-powered mill to grind their millet with the military pension he has earned. Coming home to his childhood village however Sogo finds himself unable to access his pension. After many years of being denied the money which is rightfully his, Sogo returns to his village with a gun in hand. After being sent to jail, the women of the village rally for Sogo to be set free.

Cast
Mamadou Zerbo (as Sogo)
Aï Keïta 
Noufou Ouédraogo (as Papa)
Besani Raoul Kjalil
Serges Henri
Safiatou Sanou
Sonia Karen Sanou
Stanislas Soré

Themes
Although a comedy, the film containers the serious theme of thousands of African soldiers who fought for France in the major wars of the 21st-century but never received the recognition nor the reimbursement they deserved.

Reception
The film was well received by critics, with praise especially for Mamadou Zerbo performance as Sogo. Cinema critic Dave Kehr noted though that the film director Sanou was all to happy to have his film fell back on old tropes of African cinema such as the folkloric theme and the setting of the noble village in opposition to the corrupt outside world.

Tasuma was released in the U.S. on DVD in 2007 as a double-feature with another Burkinabé film, Sia, le rêve du python.

References

External links

2004 films
Burkinabé comedy films
2000s French-language films
Films set in Burkina Faso
2004 comedy-drama films
2004 comedy films
2004 drama films
Burkinabé drama films